Cefn Onn Halt railway station was a halt on the Rhymney Line between Cardiff and Rhymney, Wales opened in 1915.  It closed on 27 September 1986 and was replaced by Lisvane and Thornhill, a short distance to the south. The station is close to the entrance of Caerphilly Tunnel, which resulted in trains overshooting the platform and having to reverse.

The station was adjacent to and served Cefn Onn Park (now known as Parc Cefn Onn), which was laid out from 1911 to 1933 by Ernest Prosser, a director of the Rhymney Railway which owned the line. The park was bought by Cardiff County Borough Council in 1944, which developed it as a country park. The park is now listed at Grade II on the Cadw/ICOMOS Register of  Parks and Gardens of Special Historic Interest in Wales.

Today

Both of the platforms remain, but undergrowth has consumed most of it. The Up shaped tower remains along with the mile post indicating 6 miles to Cardiff. The bridge connecting the two platforms was removed in 1999. One can still access the right platform via the former Great Western fencing.

References

External links
 

Disused railway stations in Cardiff
Former Rhymney Railway stations
Railway stations in Great Britain opened in 1915
Railway stations in Great Britain closed in 1986
1915 establishments in Wales
1986 disestablishments in Wales
Registered historic parks and gardens in Cardiff